Prince Rashid bin Hassan (born 20 May 1979) is a member of the Jordanian royal family. He is the son of Prince Hassan bin Talal and Princess Sarvath al-Hassan.

Education 

 Amman Baccalaureate School
 Port Regis School
 Harrow School - GCSE
 Royal Military Academy Sandhurst
 University of Cambridge - B.A. Hons in Oriental Studies

Career 

Prince Rashid was a captain in the Jordanian Armed Forces and is currently a brigadier in the Public Security Directorate serving as the police special operations commander.

Marriage 

Prince Rashid became officially engaged to Miss Zeina Shaban (born 1988), on 3 July 2010. They married on 22 July 2011, at the Basman Palace in Amman. A table tennis champion, Princess Zeina represented Jordan at the 2003 World Table Tennis Championships in Paris, the 2004 Summer Olympics in Athens and the 2008 Summer Olympics in Beijing where she was also the national flag bearer of Jordan.
The couple has two sons: Hassan (b. 2013) and Talal (b. 2016).

Organizations 

Head of the:

 Jordan Amateur Boxing Association from 1999 to 2007

Captain of the:

 Jordanian Polo Team since 2005

Chairman of the:

 Board of Trustees of the Hashemite Charitable Organization since 2002

Chairman of the:

 Cooperative Monitoring Center (CMC) Amman since 2006-2012

President of the:

 Jordan Taekwondo Federation since 2007

Awards 

 The Grand Cordon of the Order of the Renaissance (1996)
 The Sitara-e-Esar Award from Pakistan (2007)

References

1979 births
Living people
People educated at Amman Baccalaureate School
People educated at Port Regis School
People educated at Harrow School
Graduates of the Royal Military Academy Sandhurst
Alumni of Gonville and Caius College, Cambridge
Jordanian generals
House of Hashim
Jordanian princes
Jordanian people of Pakistani descent
Jordanian Muslims
People from Amman
Suhrawardy family
Jordanian people of Bengali descent